Bryce Bafford (born 5 June 2001), is an Australian professional footballer who plays as a midfielder for Perth RedStar.

Club career

Brisbane Roar
Bafford was part of the 2018-19 Y-League championship winning Brisbane Roar Youth team. He was substituted on for Zach Duncan in the 62nd minute as the Young Roar beat Western Sydney Wanderers Youth 3–1 in the 2019 Y-League Grand Final on 1 February 2019.

Perth Glory
On 18 November 2020, Bafford made his professional debut in a 2020 AFC Champions League clash against Shanghai Greenland Shenhua, starting before being replaced by Carlo Armiento in the 63rd minute as Glory went down 2–1.

Honours

Club
Brisbane Roar
Y-League: 2018–19

International
Australia U17
AFF U-16 Youth Championship: 2016

References

External links

2001 births
Living people
Australian soccer players
Association football midfielders
Perth Glory FC players
National Premier Leagues players